Aztekium valdezii  is a species of cactus, in the genus Aztekium. It is one of the three species that make up the genus. The species originated in Mexico. Aztekium is a genus endemic to Mexico. Aztekium valdezii, was discovered in 2011 by Mario Alberto Valdéz Marroquín in the Sierra Madre Oriental mountains of Nuevo León; the name was formally published in 2013,[3] although as of September 2013 the name is not accepted by secondary sources such as The Plant List.[4]

References

Endangered flora of North America
Flora of Mexico
Cacti of Mexico
Cactoideae